Madimoussa Traoré (born 11 June 1986 in Choisy-le-Roi) is a French former professional footballer who played as a striker.

He played on the professional level in Ligue 1 for FC Girondins de Bordeaux.

External links
 
 

1986 births
Living people
People from Choisy-le-Roi
French people of Malian descent
French footballers
Association football forwards
Ligue 1 players
Ligue 2 players
Championnat National players
Championnat National 2 players
Championnat National 3 players
FC Girondins de Bordeaux players
Gazélec Ajaccio players
CA Bastia players
ÉF Bastia players